Hartley Fort State Preserve is a  Iowa state preserve located on the Upper Iowa River in the Driftless Area, in Allamakee County of Iowa, USA.

Geography

Native Americans
The site is noted for remains of a fortified Native American effigy mound settlement. The mound builder people's era ruins seem to be associated with the Woodland period Oneota and Cahokia cultures.

Access
The Iowa Hartley Fort State Preserve land is privately owned, and there is currently no public access.

See also
Earthwork (archaeology)

Sources
Iowa Preserves Guide - see Hartley Fort State Preserve, pg. 69
Minutes of State Preserves Advisory Board, June 13, 1994 
Federal Register, March 25, 2004 (Volume 69, Number 58) Retrieved July 16, 2007
Theler, James L. and Boszhardt, Robert F. "The end of the effigy mound culture: The late woodland to Oneota transition in southwestern Wisconsin", Midcontinental Journal of Archaeology, Fall 2000, Retrieved July 16, 2007
http://sargasso.gis.iastate.edu/preserves/preserve.asp?Preserve=34 - Iowa Department of Natural Resources - Retrieved July 16, 2007 -  

Mounds in Iowa
Native American history of Iowa
Archaeological sites in Iowa
Iowa state preserves
Former Native American populated places in the United States
Protected areas of Allamakee County, Iowa
Driftless Area